The 2019 West Berkshire Council election took place on 2 May 2019 to elect members of West Berkshire Council in England. This was on the same day as other local elections.  The whole council was up for election and the Conservative Party retained overall control of the council, despite significant gains by the Liberal Democrats and the election of the first Green Party councillors in West Berkshire.

Background
At the last election in 2015, the Conservatives won a majority of seats, with 48 councillors, compared to 4 for the Liberal Democrats. No other parties had representation on the council.

There were boundary changes between the 2015 and 2019 elections, reducing the total number of seats from 52 to 43, and the number of wards from 30 to 24. The new wards elected between one and three district councillors depending on their population.

Summary

Election result

|-

Ward Results 
Winning candidates are highlighted in bold.

Aldermaston

Basildon

Bradfield

Bucklebury

Burghfield and Mortimer

Chieveley and Cold Ash

Downlands

Hungerford and Kintbury

Lambourn

Newbury Central

Newbury Clay Hill

Newbury Greenham

Newbury Speen

Newbury Wash Common

Pangbourne

Ridgeway

Thatcham Central

Thatcham Colthrop and Crookham

Thatcham North East

Thatcham West

Theale

Tilehurst and Purley

Tilehurst Birch Copse

Tilehurst South and Holybrook

By-elections

Tilehurst South and Holybrook

References 

2019 English local elections
May 2019 events in the United Kingdom
2019
2010s in Berkshire